Sasuntsi Davit is a copper equestrian statue depicting David of Sassoun (Sasuntsi Davit) in Yerevan, Armenia. Erected by Yervand Kochar in 1959, it depicts the protagonist of the Armenian national epic Daredevils of Sassoun.

History

Background
The idea to erect a statue to David of Sassoun, the epic hero of the national epic Daredevils of Sassoun, emerged in the late 1930s since the one thousandth anniversary of the epic was celebrated in Soviet Armenia in 1939. The authorities decided to have a statue to David of Sassoun be erected in the square in front of the Yerevan Railway Station to greet the visitors of Yerevan, since the majority of visitors to Yerevan came by train at the time. Yervand Kochar was selected to create a statue of the epic hero. It took him 18 days to create the statue in gypsum. The statue was destroyed in 1941 days after Kochar was arrested for supposedly praising Adolf Hitler.:28

Current statue
In 1957, on the 40th anniversary of the October Revolution, the Yerevan authorities decided to restore the statue. Kochar recreated the statue to David of Sassoun with significant changes from the 1939 original. The latter included an old Arab man besides David. The restored (current) statue was inaugurated on December 3, 1959. No top officials of the local Communist Party attended the ceremony. It was largely attended by Armenians originally from the Sasun (Sassoun) area and their descendants.

Restoration
In the post-Soviet period the statue deteriorated somewhat and the "cup of patience", located at the feet of the horse, was stolen․ It was recovered in 2011.:p. 1 That year, the statue underwent general restoration, which was funded, primarily, by Ruben Vardanyan. The pool around the statue was also restored and the Railway Station Square cleaned.:18 However, in 2012 several sculptors said the statue needed further restoration.

Proposals to move
In the post-Soviet period, some have proposed to move the statue to Republic Square, where the statue of Lenin used to stand.:34 Architect Garri Rashidyan, for instance, wrote in his 2007 book that it may be the "best solution for replacing Lenin as the central and focal point of the most important square of our republic." According to Diana Ter-Ghazaryan, David of Sassoun would be a safe choice because of the epic hero's fundamentally apolitical nature and his statue at Yerevan's central square would be acceptable by most Armenians. However, writing in 2013, she considered the relocation unlikely.

Reception
The statue has been widely admired by critics and visitors alike. Architectural historian Murad Hasratyan called it Kochar's masterpiece. In 1980 Ara Baliozian noted that the "splendid" statue has "acquired archetypal dimension." It has become a symbol of Yerevan and a landmark of Armenia. Rouben Paul Adalian noted that the "dynamic and forceful" statue is "such a compelling work of sculpture that the image became an emblematic portrait of the Soviet Armenian republic."

Another author noted that Kochar created a "lasting and powerful national value" due to his "ability to draw from the universal pool of knowledge and culture." The statue is the "condensed power of Armenia, but it is also an extension of the same power that gave birth to Michelangelo’s David." Soviet travel writer Nikolai Mikhailov praised the statue's expression of impetuousness.

An online poll by Yerevan Magazine found that Sasuntsi Davit is the most beloved statue of the residents of Yerevan.:17 Many authors have called it Yerevan's best statue.

The film studio Hayfilm (formerly Armenfilm) uses the statue as its logo.

Gallery

References

External links
 The Mystery Of David Of Sasun’s Monument

1959 sculptures